Tom Nagel (born October 27, 1980) is an American actor noted for his roles in direct-to-video films, such as The Butcher, The Apocalypse, Pirates of Treasure Island, and Hillside Cannibals.

According to IMDb, Nagel left the U.S. Navy and settled in Los Angeles, where he began his film career.

In 2012, Nagel was cast in the Temple Immersive Audio AudioDrop production of Moonie the Starbabe based on Nick Cuti's classic underground comic character. The audio production is scheduled for release in April 2012. Nagel has appeared in other AudioDrop productions, including the popular show Red Colt.

In August 2013, he and brother Brian co–founded their production company Steel House Productions LLC.

Filmography

References

External links 
 
 

1980 births
Living people
American male film actors